Information and Software Technology is a peer-reviewed scientific journal on software development and related issues, published by Elsevier. The journal was established in 1959 as Data Processing, obtaining its current title in 1987. The journal is abstracted and indexed in Scopus.

According to the Journal Citation Reports, the journal has a 2021 impact factor of 3.862.

References

External links

Publications established in 1959
Software engineering publications
English-language journals
Elsevier academic journals
10 times per year journals